Henry Stephenson (born Harry Stephenson Garraway; 16 April 1871 – 24 April 1956) was a British actor. He portrayed friendly and wise gentlemen in many films of the 1930s and 1940s. Among his roles were Sir Joseph Banks in Mutiny on the Bounty (1935) and Mr. Brownlow in Oliver Twist (1948).

Life and career
Stephenson was born to British parents in Grenada, British West Indies and educated in England. He started acting in his twenties. He appeared on British and American stages and made his Broadway debut in 1901, playing the messenger in A Message from Mars starring Charles Hawtrey. In the following decades, he performed in more than 30 Broadway plays.

Stephenson made his film debut in 1917 and appeared in a few silent films, but made his mark mostly as an elderly man in sound films. Between 1931 and 1932, he appeared in the successful Broadway play Cynara with over 200 performances. He came to Hollywood for the film version of Cynara, starring Ronald Colman and with Stephenson reprising his role of John Tring. In the same year, he played the tycoon C.B. Gaerste in Red-Headed Woman, Leslie Howard's father Rufus Collier in The Animal Kingdom and Doctor Alliot in A Bill of Divorcement. In 1933, he appeared as Mr. Laurence in Little Women. He specialized in portraying wise, dignified and friendly British gentlemen in supporting roles.

He appeared overall in 90 films from 1917 to 1951. He often played historical figures like Sir Joseph Banks in the Oscar-winning adventure film Mutiny on the Bounty (1935) and Florimond Claude, Comte de Mercy-Argenteau in Marie Antoinette (1938).

Stephenson worked with film star Errol Flynn in the films Captain Blood, The Charge of the Light Brigade, The Prince and the Pauper, and The Private Lives of Elizabeth and Essex, often as Flynn's paternal friend and superior. He portrayed Sir Thomas Lancing in Tarzan Finds a Son! in 1939, and Sir Guy Henderson in Tarzan and the Amazons in 1945.

He seldom played dark figures; among the exceptions was the snobbish Mr. Bryant in Mr. Lucky in 1943. Stephenson also appeared in literary adaptions, for example as the friendly lawyer Havisham in Little Lord Fauntleroy (1936) and as Mr. Brownlow in David Lean's film adaptation of Oliver Twist (1948). He made his last film in 1949, but appeared in two television series in 1951 before the end of his career. In 1950, after finishing his role of Cardinal Gaspar de Quiroga in the play That Lady, Stephenson retired from the stage.

Family
He married the Australian-born actress Roxy Barton (1879-1962) on 14 June 1906 at St Marylebone Parish Church in Marylebone in London. Their daughter was the actress Jean Harriet Garraway  (1911–2004). The marriage was later dissolved. He married the actress Ann Shoemaker; the couple had one daughter. Henry Stephenson died in 1956, aged 85. He was survived by his wife and his daughters.

Filmography

 The Spreading Dawn (1917) as Mr. LeRoy (film debut)
 A Society Exile (1919) as Sir Howard Furnival
 The Tower of Jewels (1920) as David Parrish
 The Black Panther's Cub (1921) as Clive, Earl of Maudsley
 Men and Women (1925) as Arnold Kirke
 Wild, Wild Susan (1925) as Peter Van Dusen
 Red-Headed Woman (1932) as Gaerste
 Guilty as Hell (1932) as Dr. Ernest S. Tindal
 A Bill of Divorcement (1932) as Dr. Alliot
 The Animal Kingdom (1932) as Mr. Rufus Collier
 Cynara (1932) as John Tring
 Tomorrow at Seven (1933) as Thornton Drake
 Double Harness (1933) as Colonel Sam Colby
 Blind Adventure (1933) as Maj. Archer Thorne
 My Lips Betray (1933) as De Conti
 Little Women (1933) as Mr. Laurence
 If I Were Free (1933) as Hector Stribling
 Man of Two Worlds (1934) as Sir Basil Pemberton
 The Mystery of Mr. X (1934) as Sir Herbert Frensham
 All Men Are Enemies (1934) as Scrope
 Stingaree (1934) as Mr. Hugh Clarkson
 Thirty Day Princess (1934) as King Anatol XII
 One More River (1934) as Sir Laurence Mont
 She Loves Me Not (1934) as Dean Mercer
 The Richest Girl in the World (1934) as Connors
 Outcast Lady (1934) as Sir Maurice
 What Every Woman Knows (1934) as Charles Venables
 The Night Is Young (1935) as Emperor Franz Josef
 Vanessa: Her Love Story (1935) as Barney Newmark
 Reckless (1935) as Col. Harrison
 The Flame Within (1935) as Dr. Jock Frazier
 O'Shaughnessy's Boy (1935) as Major Winslow
 Rendezvous (1935) as Ambassador
 Mutiny on the Bounty (1935) as Sir Joseph Banks
 The Perfect Gentleman (1935) as Bishop
 Captain Blood (1935) as Lord Willoughby
 Little Lord Fauntleroy (1936) as Havisham
 Half Angel (1936) as Professor Jerome Hargraves
 Hearts Divided (1936) as Chas. Patterson
 Walking on Air (1936) as Mr. Horace Bennett
 Give Me Your Heart (1936) as Edward - Lord Farrington
 The Charge of the Light Brigade (1936) as Sir Charles Macefield
 Beloved Enemy (1936) as Lord Athleigh
 When You're in Love (1937) as Walter Mitchell
 The Prince and the Pauper (1937) as the Duke of Norfolk
 The Emperor's Candlesticks (1937) as Prince Johann
 Conquest (1937) as Count Anastas Walewski
 Wise Girl (1937) as Mr. Fletcher
 The Baroness and the Butler (1938) as Count Albert Sandor
 The Young in Heart (1938) as Mr. Anstruther
 Marie Antoinette (1938) as  Count de Mercey
 Suez (1938) as Count Mathieu de Lesseps
 Dramatic School (1938) as Pasquel Sr.
 Tarzan Finds a Son! (1939) as Sir Thomas Lancing
 The Adventures of Sherlock Holmes (1939) as Sir Ronald Ramsgate
 The Private Lives of Elizabeth and Essex (1939) as  Lord Burghley
 Little Old New York (1940) as Chancellor Robert L. Livingstone
 It's a Date (1940) as Capt. Andrew
 Spring Parade (1940) as Emperor Franz Joseph
 Down Argentine Way (1940) as Don Diego Quintana
 The Man Who Lost Himself (1941) as Frederick Collins
 Lady from Louisiana (1941) as General Anatole Mirbeau
 Rings on Her Fingers (1942) as Colonel Harry Prentiss
 This Above All (1942) as General Cathaway
 Halfway to Shanghai (1942) as Colonel Algernon Blimpton
 The Mantrap (1943) as Sir Humphrey Quilp
 Mr. Lucky (1943) as Mr. Bryant
 Two Girls and a Sailor (1944) as John Dyckman Brown I
 The Hour Before the Dawn (1944) as Gen. Hetherton
 Secrets of Scotland Yard (1944) as Sir Reginald Meade
 Reckless Age (1944) as J. H. Wadsworth
 Tarzan and the Amazons (1945) as Sir Guy Henderson
 The Green Years (1946) as Prof. Rattray Blakely
 Heartbeat (1946) as Minister
 Night and Day (1946) as Omar Cole
 Of Human Bondage (1946) as Dr. Tyrell
 Her Sister's Secret (1946) as Mr. Dubois
 The Return of Monte Cristo (1946) as Prof. Duval
 The Locket (1946) as Lord Wyndham
 Time Out of Mind (1947) as Wellington Drake
 The Homestretch (1947) as Don Humberto Balcares
 Dark Delusion (1947) as Dr. Evans Biddle
 Ivy (1947) as Judge
 Song of Love (1947) as King Albert
 Oliver Twist (1948) as Mr. Brownlow
 Julia Misbehaves (1948) as Lord Pennystone
 Enchantment (1948) as General Fitzgerald
 Challenge to Lassie (1949) as Sir Charles Loring (final film)

References

External links

 
 
 

1871 births
1956 deaths
English male film actors
English male silent film actors
English male stage actors
Deaths from pneumonia in California
Burials at Kensico Cemetery
20th-century English male actors
British expatriate male actors in the United States
British expatriates in Grenada